Ye Xuanning (October 1938 – 10 July 2016) was a Chinese politician, general and businessman.

Early life and education
Ye was born in British Hong Kong in October 1938, the son of Ye Jianying, a Communist general, Marshal of the People's Liberation Army, and Zeng Xianzhi, a descendant of Zeng Guoquan and a Standing Committee member of the 4th and 5th Chinese People's Political Consultative Conference. Ye Xuanning was raised in his maternal grandmother's home, in Heye Town of Shuangfeng County, in Hunan province. In 1950, he relocated to Beijing, living with his father. He attended The High School Affiliated To Beijing Normal University and Beijing 101 High School. In 1958, he entered Harbin Institute of Military Engineering (now Harbin Engineering University), where he studied alongside Zhang Yanzhong (son of Zhang Dingcheng, Procurator-General of the Supreme People's Procuratorate) and Wang Xing (son of Wang Ruofei, Member of the ruling Communist Party's Central Committee), after which he transferred to Beijing Institute of Technology due to poor health.

Career

After graduating from Beijing Institute of Technology in 1960, he was assigned to a radio parts factory in Zhuzhou, Hunan, then he was transferred to Shangrao, Jiangxi. In 1974, while operating a machine, his right arm was cut off.

In 1978, Ye served as secretary of Kang Shien, director of the Economic Commission of the State Council.

In 1980, Ye had made a crossover from politics to business. He became the president of Canglang Consulting Corporation. In 1984, he served as vice-president of the China Association for International Friendly Contact (CAIFC). That same year, he enlisted in the People's Liberation Army. He was promoted to the rank of major general (shao jiang) in September 1988.

In 1990, Ye was appointed head of the Liaison Department of the PLA General Political Department. In 1993, he became president of China Carrie Enterprises Limited.

Ye retired from the army in 1997. He was a member of the 8th National Committee of the Chinese People's Political Consultative Conference and a Standing Committee member of the 9th Chinese People's Political Consultative Conference. Ye was also a calligrapher, famous for his cursive calligraphy.

On July 10, 2016, Ye died of lung cancer at Zhongshan Hospital, in Guangzhou, Guangdong.

Princelings
Ye was the leader or godfather of the Princelings. He was low-profile but influential in political, military and business circles. Many people who ran into troubles looked for Ye, who was always able to resolve their problems.

Personal life
Ye married painter Qian Ningge, daughter of Qian Yimin, a Communist revolutionist and politician. They had a son, Ye Hong, and a daughter, Ye Jingzi. His son-in-law is Wang Jingyang, grandson of Wang Zhen, one of the Eight Elders of the Communist Party of China.

References

External links

1938 births
2016 deaths
Hakka generals
Beijing Institute of Technology alumni
People's Republic of China politicians from Hong Kong
Chinese Communist Party politicians
People's Republic of China calligraphers
Deaths from lung cancer
People's Liberation Army generals
Hong Kong people of Hakka descent
People from Meixian District
Deaths from cancer in the People's Republic of China